Ahmed Abdelwahed (born 26 May 1996 in Rome) is an Italian steeplechase runner of Egyptian origin who won a bronze medal at the 2018 Mediterranean Games. He competed at the 2020 Summer Olympics, in 3000 m steeplechase. His parents are from Egypt.

On 12 September 2022 he was suspended by the Athletics Integrity Unit after he tested positive for Meldonium.

Personal bests
3000 metres steeplechase: 8:21.54 -  Ostrava, 19 May 2021

Achievements

National titles
 Italian Athletics Championships
 3000 metres steeple-chase: 2019

See also
 Italy at the 2018 Mediterranean Games
 Naturalized athletes of Italy

References

External links

1996 births
Living people
Italian male steeplechase runners
Italian people of Egyptian descent
Italian sportspeople of African descent
Athletes (track and field) at the 2018 Mediterranean Games
Mediterranean Games silver medalists for Italy
Athletics competitors of Fiamme Gialle
Mediterranean Games medalists in athletics
Italian Athletics Championships winners
Competitors at the 2017 Summer Universiade
Athletes (track and field) at the 2020 Summer Olympics
Olympic athletes of Italy
European Athletics Championships medalists
Italian sportspeople in doping cases
Doping cases in athletics